Carmen Rocío Benítez Cabrera (born 5 April 1986) is a Paraguayan footballer who plays as a right back for Libertad/Limpeño. She was a member of the Paraguay women's national team.

International career
Benítez was named by Paraguay for three Copa América Femenina editions (2006, 2010 and 2018).

Honours

Club
Sportivo Limpeño
Copa Libertadores Femenina: 2016

References

1986 births
Living people
Paraguayan women's footballers
Women's association football fullbacks
Paraguay women's international footballers